Vostochny (from Russian language: "Eastern") Coal Mine is a coal mining company located in Ekibastuz, Kazakhstan. The company is included in the JSC Eurasian Energy Corporation.
The Vostochny Coal Mine was commissioned on 19 September 1985 and has produced more than 240 million tons of coal since the start of operations. The projected capacity of the mine defined by the institute "Karagandagiproshaht" is 20 million tons of coal a year. 
On October 1, 1996 Vostochny Mine became one of the companies of Eurasian Natural Resources Corporation. In 2008, 19.8 million tons of coal were extracted from the mine.

Conveyor transportation
The Vostochny Mine is a unique coal mine. For the first time in world practice streaming technology of coal with conveyor transportation to the surface processing facility was designed and implemented. In order to add more value to the coal, along with coal mining, processing is performed before sending it to consumers .

Processing
Coal extracted from different parts of Vostochny mine is processed in homogenizing warehouses until it reaches average quality. Application of the homogenization technology can quickly respond to changes in quality indicators in the slaughter to ensure the same characteristics of coal, and, ultimately, to ship consumer the products that have consistent quality. Coal of Vostochny is appreciated by its consumers. Its use increases the efficiency of electric power plants, reducing harmful emissions into the atmosphere.

Sources

References

External links

 Inform.kz

Coal companies of Kazakhstan
Eurasian Natural Resources Corporation
Coal mines in the Soviet Union